Stictosia crocea is a moth in the family Erebidae first described by Jeremy Daniel Holloway in 2001. It is found on Borneo. The habitat consists of lowland swamp forests and dipterocarp forests on limestone.

The length of the forewings is 7–8 mm. The forewings are deep orange, speckled with black scales. The hindwings are pale yellow.

References

Moths described in 2001
Nudariina